This is a list of diplomatic missions in Ecuador.  At present, the capital city of Quito hosts 41 embassies while several other countries have ambassadors accredited from other regional capitals.  Several countries also maintain consulates or consulates general in other Ecuadorian cities. This listing excludes honorary consulates.

Diplomatic missions in Quito

Embassies

Other missions or delegations
 (Commercial Office of Taipei)

Gallery

Consulates General/Consulates
Cuenca

Esmeraldas
 (Consulate)

Guayaquil
 (Consulate)

 (Consulate)

Machala

Nueva Loja
 (Consulate)

Santo Domingo de los Colorados
 (Consulate)

Tulcán
 (Consulate)

Closed missions

Non-resident Embassies

See also
 Foreign relations of Ecuador

References

External links
Ecuador Diplomatic List

List
Ecuador
Diplomatic missions